Recordando is the second studio album by Shaila Dúrcal. It was released on September 2, 2006. A special edition was released on February 26, 2008.

Track listing

Standard Edition
No Sirvo Para Estar Sin Ti
Volverte A Ver
Déjame Vivir
Amor Eterno
Si Yo Tuviera Rosas
Como Tu Mujer
Jamás Me Cansaré De Ti
Por Ti
Tarde
No Lastimes Más
Vuélvete La Luna
Costumbres

Special Edition
No Sirvo Para Estar Sin Ti
Volverte A Ver
Déjame Vivir
Amor Eterno
Si Yo Tuviera Rosas
Como Tu Mujer
Jamás Me Cansaré De Ti
Por Ti
Tarde
No Lastimes Más
Vuélvete La Luna
Costumbres
Vivir Así Es Morir De Amor
Si Nos Dejan
Volver Volver
De Que Manera Te Olvido
Sola

DVD Track list
No Sirvo Para Estar Sin Ti
Vuélvete La Luna
Por Ti
EPK Un Dia En La Gira De Shaila Dúrcal
Entrevista Personal En Casa de Shaila Dúrcal

References

2006 albums
Shaila Dúrcal albums
Spanish-language albums